Nirmalendu Bhattacharya (died 5 July 2020) was an Indian politician. He was a member of Indian National Congress. He was a vice-president of West Bengal Pradesh Congress Committee. He played an important role in West Bengal's politics since 1970s.

References 

2020 deaths
Indian National Congress politicians from West Bengal
Date of birth missing